Bishop Leontius (secular name Vladimir Fyodorovich von Wimpffen, born Baron Leopold von Wimpffen; 18 May 1873 in Moscow – 6 June 1919 in Astrakhan) was a bishop of the Russian Orthodox Church, auxiliary bishop of Yenotayevka.

Biography 
Leontius was from a distinguished noble family, the Wimpffen. His father, Baron Theodore von Wimpffen, was a German citizen. His Mother, Lyubov Voyeikova, belonged to the families of the Moscow noblemen.

He was baptized in the Lutheran Church with the name of Leopold and in conscious age, influenced by his mother converted to Orthodoxy and took name Vladimir.

On September 28, 1914 was ordained bishop of Cheboksary, vicar of Kazan diocese. 

Since February 12, 1915 was Bishop of Yerevan (Armenia), vicar of the Georgian exarchate.

Since March 24, 1916 was Bishop of Kustanai, vicar Orenburg diocese.

Since December 16, 1916 he became Bishop of Petrovsk, vicar of Saratov diocese.

Came into conflict with the ruling bishop Palladius (Dobronravov). May 5, 1917 was dismissed with the appointment of his seat in the Astrakhan Pokrovo-Boldinsky monastery.

Since September 5, 1917 was Bishop of Enotaevka, vicar of Astrakhan diocese.

September 26, 1918 Bishop Leontius was retired.

June 7, 1919 by order of Sergey Kirov was arrested and charged (along with Archbishop Mitrophan of Astrakhan) with organization of the White Guard conspiracy.

Shot June 23, 1919 in one day with Archbishop Mitrophan. It is known that they meet before the execution. Bishops in the face of impending death, forgot all his previous wrongs, asked each other for forgiveness, bowed to each other to the ground and embraced. They were thrown into a hole, and refused a burial.

External links
 Hieromartyr Leontius Of Tsarevo

Bishops of the Russian Orthodox Church
Eastern Orthodoxy in Armenia
1873 births
1919 deaths
Barons of Germany
Wimpffen family
Converts to Eastern Orthodoxy from Lutheranism
Russian people of German descent